Renapur is a town in Latur subdivision of Latur District in the Indian state of Maharashtra. It is the headquarters for Renapur Taluka. The town is located 20 kilometres from the city of Latur, the district administrative centre. There is a temple of Renuka devi, and there is a river named Rena. Because of these two reasons Renapur is very popular.  There is a popular market named "Chandani chowk".

Due to an influx of workers to the city of Latur, it expanded towards Renapur during the 1990s, 2000s and 2010s. Formerly, Renapur was in Beed District, but it was moved to Latur District.

History
Renapur was part of Hyderabad State. Under the British, Renapur was known as the land of freedom fighters. Mr. Murgappa Khumse was a well knownQuestioned freedom fighter who came from this area. He was also a part of Goa Mukti Sangram (Goa Peasant Organization), Hyderabad Mukti Sangram (Hyderabad Peasant Organization) and freedom fighting throughout India. He was the chief of Shatkari Shetmajur Panchayat for the state of Maharashtra. He was social worker and also a writer.

Demographics
In the 2001 Indian census, the village of Renapur recorded 11,596 inhabitants, of which 5,956 were males (51.4%) and 5,640 were females (48.6%).

References

Latur district
Villages in Latur district
Neighbourhoods in Latur
Talukas in Maharashtra
Cities and towns in Latur district
Villages in Renapur taluka